María de los Ángeles Teresa de Jesús Villar Dondé, better known as Tere Velázquez (8 March 1942 – 7 January 1998) was a Mexican actress. She appeared in 86 films and television shows between 1957 and 1996. She starred in the film Young People, which was entered into the 11th Berlin International Film Festival. She died on 7 January 1998 in Mexico City after a long battle with colon cancer.

Selected filmography
 Golden Legs (1958)
 Sube y baja (1959)
 His First Love (1960)
 Dangers of Youth (1960)
 Young People (1961)
 The Rape of the Sabine Women (1962)
 El Valle de las espadas (1963)
 Corazón salvaje (1968)
 The Incredible Professor Zovek (1972)
 The Killer Must Kill Again (1975)

External links

1942 births
1998 deaths
Mexican film actresses
Actresses from Mexico City
Deaths from cancer in Mexico
20th-century Mexican actresses